Marsilea is a genus of approximately 65 species of aquatic ferns of the family Marsileaceae. The name honours Italian naturalist Luigi Ferdinando Marsili (1656–1730).

These small plants are of unusual appearance and do not resemble common ferns. Common names include water clover and four-leaf clover because of the long-stalked leaves have four clover-like lobes and are either present above water or submerged.

The sporocarps of some Australian species are very drought-resistant, surviving up to 100 years in dry conditions. On wetting, the gelatinous interior of the sporocarp swells, splitting it and releasing a worm-like mass that carries sori, eventually leading to germination of spores and fertilization.

Uses

As food
Sporocarps of some Australian species such as Marsilea drummondii are edible and have been eaten by Aborigines and early white settlers, who knew it under the name ngardu or nardoo. Parts of Marsilea drummondii contain an enzyme which destroys thiamine (vitamin B1), leading to brain damage in sheep and horses. During floods in the Gwydir River basin 2,200 sheep died after eating nardoo. Three-quarters of the sheep that were affected did however respond to thiamine injections. Thiamine deficiency from incorrectly prepared nardoo likely resulted in the starvation and death of Burke and Wills.

The leaves of Marsilea crenata are part of the  East Javanese cuisine of Indonesia, especially in the city of Surabaya.  It is called Pecel Semanggi and is served with spicy peanut and sweet potato sauce.

Ornamental
A few species in the genus, such as Marsilea crenata, Marsilea exarata, Marsilea hirsuta, and Marsilea quadrifolia, are grown in aquaria.

Formerly placed here
Salvinia natans (L.) All. (as M. natans L.)

Phylogeny
Molecular phylogenetic analysis of the genus Marsilea shows the following tree.  This tree indicates that M. crenata is the same species (or a subspecies) of M. minuta, and possibly M. fadeniana also.  Additionally, this analysis contradicts reports that M. polycarpa is a synonym for M. minuta

Other species include:
Marsilea aethiopica Launert
Marsilea apposita Launert
Marsilea batardae Launen
Marsilea burchellii A.Braun
Marsilea condensata Bak.
Marsilea cryptocarpa Albr. & Chinnock
Marsilea fenestrata Launert
Marsilea globulosa Bouchart
Marsilea hickenii Herter
Marsilea latzii Jones
Marsilea megalomanica Launert
Marsilea pyriformis Bouchart
Marsilea quadrata Brown
Marsilea ×subangulata Brown
Marsilea subterranea Leprieur
Marsilea unicornis Launert
Marsilea vera Launert

See also
 Bush bread

References

Mabberley, D.J. (1997). The Plant-Book. Cambridge University Press.
Edmund Russow: Histologie und Entwicklungsgeschichte der Sporenfrucht von Marsilia. Dissertation. Dorpat 1871 (PDF)
Johnson 1986 Systematics of the New World species of Marsilea. Syst. Bot. Monog. 11:1–87.
World species list for Marsilea

 
Aquatic plants
Fern genera
ja:デンジソウ